Everett Edward Dow (July 7, 1853 – September 23, 1929) was a member of the Wisconsin State Assembly during the 1901 session. A native of La Grange, Wisconsin, Dow represented the 1st District of Walworth County, Wisconsin. Dow was a Republican.

He died in 1929 after a short illness, survived by two daughters and four sons.

References

External links
The Political Graveyard

People from La Grange, Wisconsin
Republican Party members of the Wisconsin State Assembly
1853 births
1929 deaths